Freke is a surname, and may refer to:

 John Freke (disambiguation)
 Nathan Freke (born 1983), British Formula Ford champion
Percy Freke, Irish politician
 Percy Freke (politician) (died 1707), Irish politician
 Percy Evans Freke (1844–1931), Irish ornithologist and entomologist
 Timothy Freke (born 1959), British author of books on religion and mysticism
 Freke baronets, descended from Percy Freke

See also
 Geri and Freki